The Granite Mountains of Arizona is a mountain range in the Sonoran Desert of southern Arizona. It is located in extreme western Pima County, Arizona, bordering southeast Yuma County.

The Granite Mountains are an 18-mile (29 km) long range, trending mostly northwest-southeast; the north end of the range turns more northerly and  aligns with the Aguila Mountains of Yuma County 6 miles north.

The west and south end of the mountains lie at the southeastern beginning of the San Cristobal Valley flowing northwest and north to the Gila River Valley. The east side of the range borders the north-flowing Growler Valley. The southern end of the mountains are adjacent to a water divide where south-flowing drainages enter into portions of northern Sonora, Mexico.

See also 
 List of mountain ranges of Arizona

Mountain ranges of the Sonoran Desert
Mountain ranges of Pima County, Arizona
Mountain ranges of Arizona